American country music band The Mavericks have released eleven studio albums,  six compilation albums, three live albums and one EP album. The band's highest-certified album is 1994's What a Crying Shame, certified platinum by the RIAA and double platinum by the CRIA. 1995's Music for All Occasions was certified gold in the US and platinum in Canada, while Trampoline and It's Now! It's Live!, both from 1998, earned gold certification in Canada.

The Mavericks also released twenty eight singles. Although fourteen of these charted on the Billboard country singles charts, none reached Top Ten on that chart, with the highest-peaking being the number 13 "All You Ever Do Is Bring Me Down", a collaboration with accordionist Flaco Jiménez. "What a Crying Shame", "O What a Thrill", and "Here Comes the Rain" all reached top ten on the former RPM Country Tracks charts in Canada. "Dance the Night Away" and "I've Got This Feeling" both entered the UK Singles Chart, with the former peaking at number four.

Studio albums

1990s

2000s–2020s

Compilation albums

Live albums

Extended plays

Singles

1990s

2000s–2010s

Music videos

Notes

References

Country music discographies
Discographies of American artists